Nebria macedonica is a species of ground beetle in the Nebriinae subfamily that can be found in Varnous province of Greece and on Baba Mountain of North Macedonia.

References

macedonica
Beetles described in 1938
Beetles of Europe